Shen Weiwei (born 31 July 1980) is a Chinese fencer. She competed in the women's individual and team épée events at the 2004 Summer Olympics.

References

1980 births
Living people
Chinese female fencers
Olympic fencers of China
Fencers at the 2004 Summer Olympics
Sportspeople from Nantong
Fencers from Jiangsu
Asian Games medalists in fencing
Fencers at the 1998 Asian Games
Fencers at the 2002 Asian Games
Asian Games gold medalists for China
Asian Games silver medalists for China
Asian Games bronze medalists for China
Medalists at the 1998 Asian Games
Medalists at the 2002 Asian Games
21st-century Chinese women